Sokrat Mojsov (born 1 March 1942 in Setina) is a former Macedonian football player. He capped 3 times for Yugoslavia. He was considered one of the best Macedonian players from the pre 1992-Yugoslavia era. He was noted for his heading ability and individual skills with the ball.

Club career
He started his career with Vardar as a youth player, and quickly moved up the ranks to the senior team. He played 362 times and scored 166 goals in all competitions for them. He played 2 years in France for Stade Rennais, in Ligue 1 and retired in 1973.

International career
He made his senior debut for Yugoslavia in an April 1964 friendly match against Bulgaria and has earned a total of 3 caps, scoring no goals. His final international was a September 1966 friendly against the Soviet Union.

References

External links
 
Profile on Serbian federation official site

1942 births
Living people
Slavic speakers of Greek Macedonia
Association football forwards
Yugoslav footballers
Yugoslavia international footballers
Macedonian footballers
FK Vardar players
Stade Rennais F.C. players
Yugoslav First League players
Yugoslav Second League players
Ligue 1 players
Yugoslav expatriate footballers
Expatriate footballers in France
Yugoslav expatriate sportspeople in France
People from Meliti (municipal unit)